Zakłady Naprawcze Taboru Kolejowego (ZNTK) were a network of rolling stock maintenance and construction factories in Poland. It was formed during the 1950 reorganisation of the state-owned Polish State Railways out of previously-operating "Main Mechanical Workshops". The network included yards in most larger towns of Poland and was headed by the largest of workshops, the ZNTK Ostrów in Ostrów Wielkopolski. Despite name, some of the ZNTK also manufactured rolling stock, like diesel locomotives and diesel multiple units (ZNTK Poznań).

In 1991 the ZNTK network was excluded from within the Polish State Railways holding. Since then most of them were either privatised or liquidated. The most important companies founded on the basis of former ZNTK workshops are:

 ZNTK Bydgoszcz - PESA SA
 ZNTK Gliwice & ZNTK Nowy Sącz - Newag
 ZNTK Gorzów Wielkopolski - Gorzów Wagony
 ZNTK Mińsk Mazowiecki, 60% owned by PESA SA
 ZNTK Ostróda - GATX Rail Poland
 ZNTK Ostrów - Fabryka Wagon
 ZNTK Poznań - Poznańskie Zakłady Naprawcze Taboru Kolejowego

Rail vehicle manufacturers of Poland
Manufacturing companies established in 1950
1950 establishments in Poland